Tumbalá is a town and one of the 119 Municipalities of Chiapas, in southern Mexico.

As of 2010, the municipality had a total population of 31,723, up from 15,890 as of 2005. It covers an area of 109.3 km2.

As of 2010, the town of Tumbalá had a population of 3,227. Other than the town of Tumbalá, the municipality had 127 localities, the largest of which (with 2010 populations in parentheses) were: Joshil (3,110), Hidalgo Joshil (2,496) and Mariscal Subikuski (1,036), classified as rural.

References

Municipalities of Chiapas